Coloradoan could refer to:
an antiquated term for a resident of Colorado
Fort Collins Coloradoan, a newspaper
Coloradoan (train), a passenger train operated by the Chicago, Burlington and Quincy Railroad